Deportes Linares is a Chilean Football club, their home town is Linares in Chile and play in the 3rd tier of Chilean football, the Segunda División.

The club was founded on November 19, 1955 as Lister Rossel (a famous local pediatrician and amateur sportsman). In 1974 the club name was changed to Deportes Linares.

The year 1992 the team's name was changed again, to be known as Frutilinares.

A new name, this time Linares Unido, was given to the club in 2006. And finally, in 2011, the club took back their current name, Deportes Linares.

2013 squad

Honours

 Tercera División: 1
 1994
 Cuarta División: 1
 2011

39 seasons in Primera B
12 seasons in Tercera División
1 season in Cuarta División

See also

Chilean football league system

External links
Official Website 

Football clubs in Chile
Association football clubs established in 1955
Sport in Maule Region
1955 establishments in Chile